Katharine M. Kanak is an American atmospheric scientist with noted publications on the dynamics and morphologies of atmospheric vortices, including tornadoes, tropical cyclones, misocyclones and landspouts, and dust devils both terrestrial and Martian.

Kanak earned a B.S. from the University of Oklahoma (OU) in 1987, majoring in meteorology and minoring in mathematics. She went to the University of Wisconsin–Madison for a M.S. in meteorology, earned in 1990 with the thesis Three-Dimensional, Non-Hydrostatic Numerical Simulation of a Developing Tropical Cyclone. She returned to OU and was awarded a Ph.D. in 1999 with the dissertation On the Formation of Vertical Vortices in the Atmosphere. Kanak is interested in turbulent boundary layer structures and eddies generally and is additionally interested in tornadogenesis and cloud physics. She has developed three-dimensional numerical models for both Earth and Mars and collaborated in field research. Kanak was assistant field coordinator for Project VORTEX in 1994-1995 and participated in STEPS in 2000 as well as VORTEX2 in 2009-2010.

See also

 Jerry Straka
 Erik N. Rasmussen

References

External links
 School of Meteorology profile
 

Living people
American meteorologists
University of Oklahoma alumni
University of Wisconsin–Madison College of Letters and Science alumni
University of Oklahoma faculty
Storm chasers
Year of birth missing (living people)